Windt is a German and Dutch surname.

Geographical distribution
As of 2014, 33.2% of all known bearers of the surname Windt were residents of Germany (frequency 1:71,441), 20.2% of the United States (1:528,918), 16.6% of South Africa (1:96,211), 16.4% of the Netherlands (1:30,417), 2.0% of Hungary (1:144,359) and 1.2% of Australia (1:566,045), 1.2% of Austria (1:207,667), 1.1% of Canada (1:968,369), 1.1% of Brazil (1:5,527,357), 1.0% of Sweden (1:289,611) and 1.0% of Romania (1:608,420).

In Germany, the frequency of the surname was higher than national average (1:71,441) in the following states:
 1. Bremen (1:12,201)
 2. Hamburg (1:22,923)
 3. Lower Saxony (1:29,509)
 4. Saxony-Anhalt (1:33,284)
 5. Schleswig-Holstein (1:60,962)
 6. Hesse (1:62,357)
 7. North Rhine-Westphalia (1:62,443)

In the Netherlands, the frequency of the surname was higher than national average (1:30,417) in the following provinces:
 1. Groningen (1:6,174)
 2. North Holland (1:15,924)
 3. Flevoland (1:16,656)
 4. Drenthe (1:20,150)
 5. Gelderland (1:28,367)

People
Chris van der Windt (1877-1952), Dutch painter
Harry de Windt (1856-1933), French travel writer
Henny van der Windt (1955- ), Dutch ecologist
Herbert Windt (1894-1965), German composer
Katja Windt (1969- ), German mechanical engineer
Peter Windt (1973- ), Dutch field hockey player
Pierre de Windt (1983- ), Aruban athlete
Kramies Windt (1974- ), American music, composer, songwriter

References

German-language surnames
Dutch-language surnames